Lord Roberts may refer to:

Place
Lord Roberts (electoral district), a provincial electoral division in the Canadian province of Manitoba

People
John Roberts, 2nd Baron Roberts (1606–1685), English Civil War and Restoration politician and soldier also Viscount Bodmin and Earl of Radnor
Frederick Roberts, 1st Earl Roberts (1832–1914), Anglo-Irish soldier of the British Army in the Victorian Era
Wyn Roberts, Baron Roberts of Conwy (1930–2013), Welsh Conservative peer
Roger Roberts, Baron Roberts of Llandudno (born 1935), Welsh Liberal Democrat peer
Goronwy Roberts, Baron Goronwy-Roberts (1913–1981), Welsh Labour MP and peer.

See also
Baron Robartes (Roberts), (first creation) and Earl of Radnor (Robartes/Roberts family), English peerages created 1679
Baron Robartes (Roberts), (second creation) and Viscount Clifden (Agar-Robartes family), English peerage created 1869
Baron Clwyd (Roberts family), United Kingdom peerage created in 1919